Alexander Mutiso Munyao (born 10 September 1996) is a Kenyan long-distance runner who specializes in road running.

His personal best of 57:59 in the half marathon set at the 2020 Valencia Half Marathon is the fourth fastest time ever.

Personal bests
Outdoor
1500 metres – 7:56.86 (Donetsk 2013)
5000 metres – 13:21.90 (Kumamoto 2016)
10,000 metres – 27:23.03 (Yokohama 2021)

Road
Half marathon – 57:59 (Valencia 2020)
Marathon - 2:03:29 (Valencia 2022)

References

External links

1996 births
Living people
Kenyan male long-distance runners
20th-century Kenyan people
21st-century Kenyan people